San Quentin most commonly refers to San Quentin State Prison, California.

San Quentin may also refer to:

Saint Quentin (died c. 287), Christian saint
San Quentin, California, a small unincorporated community adjacent to the prison
San Quentin (1937 film), starring Humphrey Bogart
San Quentin (1946 film), directed by Gordon Douglas
"San Quentin" (song), by Nickelback, 2022
"San Quentin", a song by Johnny Cash from his 1969 album At San Quentin